Hamad Jassim (Arabic:حمد جاسم) (born 22 June 1996) is an Emirati footballer. He currently plays as a defender for Al Bataeh on loan from Sharjah .

Career
Hamad Jassim started his career at Al-Sharjah and is a product of the Al-Sharjah's youth system. On 3 May 2017, Hamad Jassim made his professional debut for Al-Sharjah against Al-Ain in the Pro League.

He was playing with Al-Sharjah and after merging Al-Sharjah, and Al-Shaab clubs under the name Al-Sharjah he was joined to Al-Sharjah. On 2 February 2018, Hamad Jassim made his professional debut for Al-Sharjah against Hatta in the Pro League .

External links

References

1996 births
Living people
Emirati footballers
Sharjah FC players
Al Urooba Club players
Al Bataeh Club players
UAE Pro League players
Association football defenders
Place of birth missing (living people)
Footballers at the 2018 Asian Games
Asian Games bronze medalists for the United Arab Emirates
Asian Games medalists in football
Medalists at the 2018 Asian Games